Gymea railway station is located on the Cronulla line, serving the Sydney suburb of Gymea. It is served by Sydney Trains T4 line services.

History
Gymea station opened on 16 December 1939 when the Cronulla line opened from Sutherland to Cronulla.

The station was upgraded in 2005 and given a lift and canopies over the stairs. 

Originally, Gymea was one of two crossing loops on the line, with the other being at Caringbah. The section from Gymea to Caringbah was duplicated in 1985, and under the Rail Clearways Program, the remaining sections of single line railway from Sutherland to Gymea and Caringbah to Cronulla were duplicated in April 2010.

Platforms & services

Transport links
Transdev NSW operates two routes via Gymea station:
974: Westfield Miranda to Gymea Bay
975: Westfield Miranda to Grays Point

References

External links

Gymea station details Transport for New South Wales

Easy Access railway stations in Sydney
Railway stations in Sydney
Railway stations in Australia opened in 1939
Cronulla railway line
Sutherland Shire